The John C. Campbell Folk School, also referred to as "The Folk School", is located in Brasstown, North Carolina, along the Cherokee County and Clay line. It is a non-profit adult educational organization based on non-competitive learning. Originally founded with an emphasis on agriculture and "the doing of life's work," the Folk School now offers classes year-round in over fifty subject areas including art, craft, music, dance, and nature studies. Established in 1925, the Folk School's motto is "I sing behind the plow".

It was listed on the National Register of Historic Places as a national historic district in 1983. The district encompasses 19 contributing buildings. Notable buildings include the Farm House (pre-1925), Keith House (1926-1928), Log House Museum (19th century, 1926), Mill House (1928), (Former) Milking Barn (now Clay Spencer Blacksmith Shop, c. 1930), Hay Barn (1931), Tower House (1933), Rock House (c. 1932), and Hill House (c. 1932).

The Folk School has week-long and weekend classes year-round in traditional and contemporary arts, including blacksmithing, music, dance, cooking, gardening, nature studies, photography, storytelling, and writing. The school campus includes a history museum, craft shop, nature trails, lodging, campground, and cafeteria. The school also holds a regular concert series and community dances. The Folk School engages the community through a variety of dance teams including: Magic Rapper, StiX in the Mud Border Morris, Dame's Rocket Northwest Clog, Rural Felicity Garland, and the JCCFS Cloggers.

History of the Folk School
After spending eighteen months traveling between Denmark, Norway, Sweden, and Finland, visiting local schools along the way, Olive Dame Campbell and her colleague Marguerite Butler, began forming the John C. Campbell Folk School in 1925 in Brasstown, North Carolina. This folk high school or folkehøjskole,  was dedicated to her late husband John C. Campbell, and was based on the Danish Folk School style of non competitive education, where no grades were given. Instead, students and teachers formed a community that worked together to help each other advance in various crafts such as blacksmithing.
  
John C. Campbell, (1867–1919) was an American educator and reformer noted for his survey of social conditions in the southern Appalachia. He was born in Indiana and raised in Wisconsin; he studied education and theology in New England.

At the turn of the century, the Southern Appalachian region of the United States was viewed as being in need of educational and social missions. Recently married to Olive Dame of Massachusetts, John undertook a fact-finding survey of social conditions in the mountains in 1908–1909. The Campbells outfitted a wagon as a traveling home and studied mountain life from Georgia to West Virginia.

While John interviewed farmers about their agricultural practices, Olive collected Appalachian ballads and studied the handicrafts of the mountain people. Both were hopeful that the quality of life could be improved by education, and in turn, wanted to preserve and share with the rest of the world the crafts, techniques and tools that the people of the area used in everyday life.

The Folkehøjskole (folk high school) had long been a force in the rural life of Denmark. These schools for life helped transform the Danish countryside into a vibrant, creative force. The Campbells talked of establishing such a school in the rural southern United States as an alternative to the higher-education facilities that drew young people away from the family farm.

Several locations were under consideration for the experimental school. On an exploratory trip, Miss Butler discussed the idea with Fred O. Scroggs, Brasstown's local storekeeper, saying that she would be back in a few weeks to determine if area residents had any interest in the idea. When she returned, it was to a meeting of over 200 people at the local church. The people of far west North Carolina enthusiastically pledged labor, building materials and other support.

Class types offered
Craft classes include: Basketry; Carpentry; Glass beadmaking; Blacksmithing; Bookbinding; Broom Making; Dollmaking; Dyeing; Felt Making; Furniture Making; Lace; Leather; Metalwork; Needlework; Quilting; Rugs; Sewing; Soap Making; Spinning; Weaving; Woodturning; and Woodworking

Art classes include: Calligraphy; Clay; Drawing; Enameling; Glass; Jewelry; Kaleidoscopes; Knitting; Marbling; Mosaics; Painting; Paper Arts; Photography; Printmaking; Sculpture; and Woodcarving.

Other types of classes include: Baking; Cooking; Dance; Folklore; Gardening; Music; Nature Studies; Storytelling; and Writing.

Campus buildings
Note: Dates of construction given when known

Other buildings
Maintenance Building (2004)
Bidstrup House (1982)
Campground (1970s)
Log Barn (1970)
The Cottage (1960s)
History Center (1939, renovated 2018)
Log Cabin Museum (1897, reconstructed 1926)

See also 
Bob Dalsemer
National Register of Historic Places listings in Cherokee County, North Carolina

References

External links
 
 Sing Behind the Plow: John C. Campbell Folk School (video from American Public Television)
 "A Basket Case in North Carolina," New York Times Magazine, May 20, 2007.
 Morris and Garland Teams of Brasstown

Education in Clay County, North Carolina
Buildings and structures in Cherokee County, North Carolina
Buildings and structures in Clay County, North Carolina
Education in North Carolina
School buildings on the National Register of Historic Places in North Carolina
Tourist attractions in Clay County, North Carolina
Protected areas of Clay County, North Carolina
National Register of Historic Places in Cherokee County, North Carolina
Historic districts on the National Register of Historic Places in North Carolina
Blacksmith shops